Adesmus temporalis is a species of beetle in the family Cerambycidae. It was described by Per Olof Christopher Aurivillius in 1908. It is known from Bolivia.

References

Adesmus
Beetles described in 1908